Heartbop is an album by the flugelhornist and composer Franco Ambrosetti which was recorded in 1981 and released on the Enja label.

Reception

The Allmusic review by Scott Yanow stated "Although flugelhornist Franco Ambrosetti is only a part-time musician (making his main living as a businessman), his playing has always been at a high level ... Advanced hard bop".

Track listing
All compositions by Franco Ambrosetti except where noted
 "Triple Play" (Hal Galper) – 10:24
 "Fairy Boat to Rio" – 7:40
 "Heart Bop" – 6:17
 "A Flat Miner" – 5:09
 "My Funny Valentine" (Richard Rodgers, Lorenz Hart) – 9:20

Personnel
Franco Ambrosetti – flugelhorn
Phil Woods – alto saxophone, clarinet
Hal Galper – piano
Mike Richmond – bass
Billy Hart – drums
George Gruntz – arranger (tracks 2–4)

References

Franco Ambrosetti albums
1981 albums
Enja Records albums